Pterolophia bipartita is a species of beetle in the family Cerambycidae. It was described by Maurice Pic in 1934.

References

bipartita
Beetles described in 1934